Ludwików  (1943-1945, German Luisenthal) is a village in the administrative district of Gmina Łąck, within Płock County, Masovian Voivodeship, in east-central Poland.

References

Villages in Płock County